The 2010 Monterrey Open was a tennis tournament played on outdoor hard courts. It was the second edition of the Monterrey Open and was categorized as an International tournament on the 2009 WTA Tour. It took place at the Sierra Madre Tennis Club in Monterrey, Mexico, from March 1 through March 7, 2010.

The tournament was headlined by former world no. 1 Jelena Janković, top-ranked Slovak players, Daniela Hantuchová and Dominika Cibulková, Ágnes Szávay, and Anastasia Pavlyuchenkova. Also in the field were Anabel Medina Garrigues, Aleksandra Wozniak, and 2010 Open GDF Suez finalist, Lucie Šafářová.

Entrants

Seeds

Rankings and seedings are as of February 22, The seedings can change.

Other entrants
The following players received wildcards into the main draw:
 Dominika Cibulková
 Daniela Hantuchová
 Jelena Janković

The following players received entry via qualifying:
 Corinna Dentoni
 Lourdes Domínguez Lino
 Olga Savchuk
 Anna Tatishvili

Finals

Singles

 Anastasia Pavlyuchenkova defeated  Daniela Hantuchová, 1–6, 6–1, 6–0
 It was Pavlyuchenkova's first career singles title.

Doubles

 Iveta Benešová /  Barbora Záhlavová-Strýcová defeated  Anna-Lena Grönefeld /   Vania King, 3–6, 6–4, [10–8]

External links
 Official website

Monterrey Open
Monterrey Open
2010 in Mexican tennis